The inner-composition of the 6th Congress was elected by the sixth composition of the Central Committee of the Russian Social Democratic Labour Party (Bolsheviks).

Narrow Composition

Secretariat

Politburo (elected on 10 October by CC)

Bureau (elected on 29 November)

General

References

Politburo of the Central Committee of the Communist Party of the Soviet Union members
Secretariat of the Central Committee of the Communist Party of the Soviet Union members
1917 establishments in Russia
1918 disestablishments in Russia